North Carolina's 107th House district is one of 120 districts in the North Carolina House of Representatives. It has been represented by Democrat Kelly Alexander since 2009.

Geography
Since 2003, the district has included part of Mecklenburg County. The district overlaps with the 38th and 41st Senate districts.

District officeholders

Election results

2022

2020

2018

2016

2014

2012

2010

2008

2006

2004

2002

References

North Carolina House districts
Mecklenburg County, North Carolina